Jorge Díaz Reverón is a Puerto Rican judge. He was the First Gentleman of Puerto Rico and husband of Wanda Vázquez Garced. Díaz Reverón is a superior court judge in Caguas.

Career 
Díaz Reverón graduated in 1987 from the Interamerican University of Puerto Rico School of Law. Began serving as a judge in December 2009 under the administration of Governor Luis Fortuño. He is a superior court judge in criminal matters at Caguas, Puerto Rico.

In December 2018, amid concerns of unlawful intervention on behalf of his wife, then Secretary of Justice Wanda Vázquez Garced, Díaz Reverón was removed from the chamber. The Chief Justice of the Supreme Court of Puerto Rico, ordered an investigation based on judicial ethical concerns which later found no probable cause.

He became the First Gentleman of Puerto Rico on August 7, 2019. In 2021 governor Pedro Pierluisi ascended him to an appeals court a move which his wife had considered while she was governor.

Personal life 
Díaz Reverón is married to politician and attorney Wanda Vázquez Garced. They have two daughters. From August 7, 2019 until January 2, 2021, they resided in La Fortaleza, the official mansion residence of the Governor of Puerto Rico.

See also 
 List of first gentlemen in the United States

References

Living people
Place of birth missing (living people)
20th-century Puerto Rican lawyers
21st-century Puerto Rican lawyers
First Ladies and Gentlemen of Puerto Rico
Interamerican University of Puerto Rico alumni
People from Caguas, Puerto Rico
Puerto Rican judges
20th-century American judges
21st-century American judges
1960 births